The Drama Desk Award for Outstanding Costume Design for a Musical is an annual award presented by Drama Desk in recognition of achievements in the theatre among Broadway, Off Broadway and Off-Off Broadway productions.

Winners and nominees

2010s

2020s

See also
 Drama Desk Award for Outstanding Costume Design of a Play
 Laurence Olivier Award for Best Costume Design
 Tony Award for Best Costume Design in a Musical

References

External links
 Drama Desk official website

Costume Design